Linnean or Linnaean may refer to:

General
 Relating to Swedish biologist Carl Linnaeus

Linnean
 Linnean Society of London
 Linnean Society of New South Wales
 Linnean Medal
 Linnean Tercentenary Medal
 Swedish Linnean Society

Linnaean
 Linnaean enterprise
 Linnaean Garden
 Linnaean Society of New England
 Linnaean Society of New York
 Linnaean taxonomy

See also
 Linnéska institutet